.ai is the Internet country code top-level domain (ccTLD) for Anguilla, a British Overseas Territory in the Caribbean. It is administered by the government of Anguilla.

It is popular with companies in and projects related to the artificial intelligence industry (AI).

Second and third level registrations 
Registrations within off.ai, com.ai, net.ai, and org.ai are available unrestrictedly, worldwide. From September 15, 2009, second level registrations within .ai are available to everyone worldwide.

Registration
The minimum registration term allowed for .ai domain is 2 years for registration and 2 years for renewal. The authority in charge of managing this extension is “WHOIS.AI”. Registrations began on 1995-02-16. The minimum length is 2 and the maximum is 63 characters. There are no requirements for registering domain, anybody can register them, local and foreign residents. 

AI domain can be suspended or revoked, if the domain is based on some illegal activity, such as violating trademarks or copyrights. The usage must not violate the laws of Anguilla.

Anguilla uses the UDRP. Filing a UDRP challenge requires using one of the ICANN Approved Dispute Resolution Service Providers. If the domain is with an ICANN accredited registrar, they should work with the arbitrator. Usually this means either doing nothing or transferring a domain. .ai domains are transferable to any desired registrars as the registration of domain is done maintaining EPP.

The character set supported by .ai domain include A-Z, a-z, 0-9, and hyphen. As of November 2022, .ai domains don't accommodate IDN characters. The auction of expired .ai domain is undertaken every ten days where expired domains can be procured through the auction process.

Valuation 
Domains are $100 for each two-year period. As of November 2021, the ".ai" registry supports Extensible Provisioning Protocol. Consequently, many registrars are allowed to sell ".ai" domains. Since then, the .ai ccTLD has also been popular with artificial intelligence companies and organizations. Though such trends are primarily seen among new AI based companies or startups. Many established AI and Tech companies preferred not to opt for .ai domain. For example, DeepMind has its domain retained at .com; Facebook has redirected its facebook.ai domain to ai.facebook.com.

As of November 2022, expert.ai is the most valued .ai domain that has been sold ever. The sell was brokered and mediated by Sedo in June 2020 and was finalized at €95,000 (about $108,000).

Impact on Anguilla's economy 
The registration fees earned from the .ai domains go to the treasury of Government of Anguilla. As per a New York Times report, in 2018, the total revenue generated out of selling .ai domains was $2.9 million.

See also
 Internet in Anguilla
 Internet in the United Kingdom

References

External links
 IANA .ai whois information
 old .ai NIC page
 .ai domain registration page
 .ai whois page
 .ai expired domain name auction

Communications in Anguilla
Country code top-level domains

sv:Toppdomän#A